Mouzon may refer to:

Places in France
Mouzon, Ardennes, a commune in the Ardennes department
Mouzon, Charente, a commune in the Charente department
Mouzon (river) the Mouzon river in Ardennes and Lorraine, France

People
Alphonse Mouzon (1948–2016), American jazz fusion drummer and percussionist
Henry Mouzon (1741–1807), an important officer under Francis Marion in the South Carolina militia during the American Revolution
Wesley Mouzon (1927–2003), professional boxer